Requiem for a Secret Agent  (also known as Requiem per un agente segreto) is an Italian international co-production Eurospy film. It was co-produced with Spain (where it was released as Consigna: Tánger 67) and West Germany (where it was released as Der Chef schickt seinen besten Mann).

The film was directed by Sergio Sollima, and was Sollima's third and last Eurospy film, and the first one he directed with his real name (in the two previous spy films he was credited as Simon Sterling). It was shot in Morocco.

Plot

O’Brien (Franco Andrei) is driving through the streets of Tangier in a sporty blue convertible, when he notices that he is being followed, He stops for petrol, and makes a phone call to Bressart (Luis Induni), warning that he might have to cancel their meeting. O'Brien kills his pursuer but later, when he arrives at his rendezvous, he finds Bressart dead and is in turn killed by the mysterious Alexej (Wolf Hillinger), who works for the former Nazi intelligence officer Rubeck (Peter van Eyck).

The American secret services operating in Morocco need a replacement for agent A139 (O'Brien). The old man (John Karlsen), who runs the service, does not think that a conventional agent will be effective against Rubeck's ruthless syndicate, and instructs Moran (Benny Deus) to contact the mercenary but effective British agent John Merrill (Stewart Granger) in Berlin, and bring him to Tangier. Merrill, who has the code name Bingo, has been helping a family escape to the West from East Germany, but only in exchange for all their valuables.

Merrill arrives in Tangier, and sees that a fellow passenger Evelyn (Daniela Bianchi) has a gun in her handbag. Ever the gentleman, Bingo removes it, smuggles it through security without her knowledge, and then returns it to her. He is met at the airport by Olafson (Giulio Bosetti), an idealistic Norwegian agent who - together with his colleague Edith (Giorgia Moll) - explains their side of the mission. Rubeck was responsible for the bombing of a U.N. airplane carrying Norwegian mediators to peace negotiations in Egypt, so Merrill's job is to both neutralise Rubeck's organisation and to send him to Norway to stand trial.

Bingo and Olafson track down Bressart's lover Betty Lou (Maria Granada), but Rubeck has anticipated this and has stationed two of his men in her room. Merrill and Olafson kill the two henchmen, but Betty Lou runs away before they can talk to her. Evelyn meets Betty Lou and reveals that she is Bressart's wife, and has come to Tangier to avenge his death. Bingo tries to speak to Betty Lou, but Alexej kills her, leaving Evelyn with the idea that Bingo ws responsible. It is revealed that Alexej had been found and adopted as a young boy by Rubeck in Poland during World Wat II, and that Rubeck has raised him as his protege.

Assuming that Bingo was also responsible for her husband's death, Evelyn hires some locals to kill him, but Bingo overpowers them and visits Evelyn to demand an explanation. He gives her a slapping, and tells her what really happened, but she does not believe his story and pulls a gun on him. In the ensuing struggle, she is shot and killed with her own gun.

Bingo decides to use Evelyn's death to find Rubeck, and persuades the Moroccan police that a blonde European was the killer. Rubeck is one of the suspects picked up by the police, and once he has been positively identified by Edith, Bingo and Olafson kidnap him. After Bingo threatens to roast him in an oven, Rubeck provides details about his syndicate, but is then rescued by Alexej. Bingo escapes by jumping through a window, and returns to Tangier where Edith tends to his injuries. Meanwhile Olafson has broken into Rubeck's house and stolen incriminating documents.

Rubeck realises the weakness of his position and makes a deal with the Americans, so that he will betray his organisation in exchange for immunity from prosecution for himself and Alexej. Bingo is offered a financial bonus, and agrees to square the deal with the Norwegians. With this in mind, Bingo waits until Olafson goes out, then seduces Edith, steals the documents that Olafson had obtained, and hands them to Moran.

Rubeck arranges a meeting of his syndicate on a yacht, then he and Bingo ensure that it is blown up, killing the senior members of the gang. Moran promises Bingo more money if he can dig up enough evidence to ensure that Rubeck is convicted. Olafson realises that Bingo has betrayed him and angrily berates him about his morals and character, but he still believes he and Edith know enough to ensure that Rubeck will be prosecuted in Norway. However, Alexej overhears the conversation, murders Olafson and plans to eliminate Edith as well.

Edith plans to fly to Oslo, but Rubeck anticipates this and sends Alexej to the airport to intercept her. Edith runs away but Alexej traps her in a hangar and is about to kill her when Bingo arrives and beats Alexej in a brutal fist fight. He goes to Rubeck's villa, where Rubeck pulls a gun on him and calls for help from Moran. But Bingo had previously removed the magazine from the gun, leaving Rubeck at his mercy. Bingo decides not to kill Rubeck, but to hand him over to Norwegian agents, infuriating Moran and sacrificing his payment from the Americans. It seems that his interaction with Olafson has enabled Bingo to find his conscience.

Edith tries again to go to Oslo, but this time she is intercepted by Bingo. They drive into the sunset together.

Cast 
 Stewart Granger: John Merrill
 Daniela Bianchi: Evelyn
 Peter van Eyck: Oscar Rubeck
 Giulio Bosetti: Erik Olafson
 Maria Granada: Betty Lou
 Giorgia Moll: Edith
 John Karlsen: The old man
 Luis Induni: Charles Bressart
 Gianni Rizzo: Atenopoulos
 Benny Deus: Moran
 Enrique Navarro: Galvao
 Franco Andrei: Ned Robbins
 Wolf Hillinger: Alexej
 Mirella Pamphili: Stripper
 Giorgia Moll: Edith

Soundtrack
The film's theme song was "Before it's Too Late", sung by Lydia MacDonald.

References

External links

1966 films
1960s spy thriller films
West German films
Films shot in Morocco
Films set in Morocco
Films set in Tangier
Films directed by Sergio Sollima
Films scored by Piero Umiliani
Italian spy thriller films
German spy thriller films
Spanish spy thriller films
Films with screenplays by Sergio Donati
1960s Italian films
1960s German films